John James Bracken (April 14, 1881 – July 16, 1954) was a Major League Baseball pitcher who played for one season. He played for the Cleveland Blues from August 7, 1901, to September 27, 1901.

On the 15th of September, Bracken gave up 24 hits in 7.5 innings as the Detroit Tigers defeated the Blues 21–0, the most lopsided victory in American League history up to that time.

References

External links

1881 births
1954 deaths
Baseball players from Cleveland
Cleveland Indians scouts
Major League Baseball pitchers
Cleveland Blues (1901) players
Milwaukee Brewers (minor league) players
Minneapolis Millers (baseball) players
Milwaukee Creams players
Baton Rouge Red Sticks players
Little Rock Travelers players
Jacksonville Jays players